Kelly Admiraal (born April 27, 1995) is a Canadian professional stock car racing driver. He last competed part-time in the NASCAR Nationwide Series, driving the No. 29 for RAB Racing.

Motorsports career results

NASCAR
(key) (Bold – Pole position awarded by qualifying time. Italics – Pole position earned by points standings or practice time. * – Most laps led.)

Nationwide Series

K&N Pro Series West

Pinty's Series

References

External links
 

1995 births
NASCAR drivers
Living people
People from Sherwood Park
Racing drivers from Alberta
Canadian racing drivers